Radio Tele La Brise is an educational, cultural, sports, and music Haitian radio and television station based in Camp-Perrin, Haiti.  It is licensed by the Conatel of Haiti since July 23rd, 2010

See also
 Media of Haiti
 Camp-Perrin

References

External links
 Listen Online on ZenoLive
 Watch Online on  our website

Radio stations in Haiti
Radio stations established in 2010